A Borrowed Identity is a 2014 Israeli drama film directed by Eran Riklis. It is based on Sayed Kashua's book Dancing Arabs (2002). In Canada the film was released under the title Dancing Arabs, which was the film's English-language title at its world premiere (one reviewer noted that the title "will prove tricky in marketing campaigns"). The film was considered a flop in Israel, with only 48,000 views, despite an $11 million budget.

It tells the story of Eyad, an Israeli-Palestinian teenager from Tira who moves to Jerusalem to attend an elite Jewish high school, where he meets Naomi, a Jewish student, and falls in love with her. As part of his school-mandated community service, he meets Yonatan, who suffers from muscular dystrophy, and his mother Edna.

Cast
Tawfeek Barhom as Eyad
Michael Moshonov as Yonatan
Yael Abecassis as Edna, Yonatan's mother
Danielle Kitsis as Naomi
Ali Suliman as Salah, Eyad's father
Marlene Bajali as Aisha, Eyad's grandmother
Laëtitia Eïdo as Fahima, Eyad's mother

Plot
Eyad (Tawfeek Barhom) is a gifted Palestinian teenager who is accepted to an elite Israeli school. His father (Ali Suliman) drives him to Jerusalem and drops Eyad off at the new school. Before entering the school, Eyad's Father tells him that the Palestinian people once longed to defeat their Jewish enemies, but will now settle for being able to live side by side with dignity.
In school, he struggles to adapt. His Israeli peers refer to him as "Ayid" and he is looked down upon by the others. Things change once he meets Naomi (Danielle Kitsis); he helps her with her chemistry schoolwork and the two start to meet at a cafe.

Yonatan (Michael Moshonov) is a disabled Israeli teen whom Eyad is assigned by the school to visit. Eyad and Yonatan develop a strong bond, as they are both considered outsiders. Back in school, Eyad and Naomi fall in love and meet up constantly, however, things begin to get complicated. Eyad excels in the classroom and begins to earn the trust and respect of his Jewish peers. He begins to sell falafel and bagels and starts to finally feel comfortable at the school. One day, as Eyad and Naomi are walking in the streets, Naomi asks Eyad to tell her he loves her in Arabic, whereupon an Israeli soldier overhears Eyad, asks to see his ID card, and aggressively questions him.

In English class, Eyad and Naomi declare their love to the others and want to tell the world about their relationship. Once Naomi tells her parents about her Palestinian boyfriend, she is no longer allowed to go back to school. Eyad also drops out of school and asks the principal to inform Naomi's parents that she can now go back to school as he is no longer there. The decision angers Eyad's father and he is no longer welcome at home, so he moves to a flat in East Jerusalem and begins to seek work as a waiter. After many unsuccessful attempts, he lands a job as a dishwasher. 

By this point, Yonatan's health has deteriorated significantly and he is no longer able to move. Yonatan's mother asks Eyad to move in with them, as she trusts him and cannot take care of Yonatan by herself.

Eyad realizes that he and Yonatan resemble each other, takes Yonatan's Israeli ID, and becomes a waiter. Yonatan's mother (Yael Abecassis) finds out, but allows Eyad to continue as long as no one ever finds out. Using Yonatan's ID, Eyad takes Yonatan's final exams and scores highly for both of them. 
Naomi serves in the IDF and tells Eyad that she is sick of lying and chooses to break things off. A while later, Yonatan dies, while Eyad (posing as Yonatan) informs the Muslim authorities that the Muslim Eyad has died. Eyad and Yonatan's mother attend the funeral and the screen goes white.

Reception
Godfrey Cheshire of the RogerEbert.com gave A Borrowed Identity 3 out of 5, while Stephanie Merry of The Washington Post gave it 3 out of 4 stars. Metacritic gave the film an approval of 73%, based on 14 reviews while Rotten Tomatoes gave Dancing Arabs 93%, based on 30 reviews. John Anderson of Newsday who called the film A Borrowed Life, gave it 3 out of 4 stars and compared it to Zaytoun. He also praised its camerawork, music, and characters. Michael Nazarewycz gave A Borrowed Identity 9 out of 10 and called it a "must see indie".

A Borrowed Identity was released on DVD on 29 October 2015.

References

External links

Further reading

Israeli drama films
2010s Arabic-language films
Interfaith romance films
Films about interracial romance
Films based on Israeli novels
Films directed by Eran Riklis
2014 drama films